OZ Systems is a Texas-based health innovation technology company that develops and implements information technology platforms primarily focused on newborn screening. OZ Systems has projects with health care providers and public health agencies in numerous states and International states as well as in England's National Health Service.

History 
OZ Systems was founded in 1996 in Arlington, Texas by Dr. Ken Pool and Dr. Terese Finitzo to build an integrated technology system that measures, tracks, analyzes and reports interoperable hospital data. In 2000, OZ Systems was awarded a statewide contract for Texas Newborn Hearing Screening. In 2013, OZ Systems developed their OZ Telepathy technology for CCHD screening that captures information directly from pulse oximeters to improve interpretive accuracy. Since then, OZ Systems has partnered with Iowa and Minnesota to provide integrated Newborn Screening Information Systems for both states. In 2014, The Newborn Foundation awarded OZ Systems CEO Dr. Terese Finitzo the EVE Innovation Award for achievements in newborn screening, policy and technology. In 2015, OZ Systems partnered with JPS Health Network on their newborn screening practice.

References 

Information technology companies of the United States